Dastira is a genus of snout moths. It was described by Francis Walker in 1859, and contains the species Dastira hippialis. It is found in Brazil.

References

Chrysauginae
Monotypic moth genera
Moths of South America
Pyralidae genera